The 1891 Wisconsin Badgers football team represented the University of Wisconsin as an independent during the 1891 college football season. Led by Herb Alward in his first and only season as head coach, the Badgers compiled a record of 3–1–1. The team's captain was Edwin H. Ahara.

Schedule

References

Wisconsin
Wisconsin Badgers football seasons
Wisconsin Badgers football